Barry Andrews (born in 1950)  is a former professional rugby league footballer who played for Cronulla-Sutherland and Eastern Suburbs in the New South Wales Rugby League (NSWRL) competition.

Playing career
Barry Andrews, a five-eight and prolific goal-kicker, played nine seasons with Cronulla-Sutherland between 1971-1979 and is the fourth highest points scorer for the club. Nicknamed 'Panda', he is currently the 5th highest first grade scorer with 657 points.

He was a member of the Cronulla Sharks grand final team that drew the 1978 Grand Final against Manly-Warringah Sea Eagles, 11 points all. He did not play in the grand final replay due to injury.

He finished his career with Eastern Suburbs in 1980.

References 

Australian rugby league players
Cronulla-Sutherland Sharks players
Living people
People from the Sutherland Shire
Sportsmen from New South Wales
1950 births
Rugby league players from Sydney
Sydney Roosters players
Rugby league five-eighths